Mulaney is an American sitcom that aired on Fox from October 5, 2014, to February 15, 2015. Stand-up comedian and former Saturday Night Live writer John Mulaney created the show and starred as a fictionalized version of himself. At the beginning of each episode, and sometimes throughout, Mulaney would perform stand-up comedy to the studio audience. The show suffered from low ratings and poor critical reviews, and was cancelled in February 2015.

Premise
John Mulaney is a comedian living in New York City with his roommates—Jane (Nasim Pedrad), a personal trainer with emotional issues, and Motif (Seaton Smith), a fellow stand-up comedian. John often receives advice from his elderly Jewish neighbor Oscar (Elliott Gould), and visits from his odd and annoying friend Andre (Zack Pearlman), a small-time drug dealer. John's life changes when he's hired as a writer for Lou Cannon (Martin Short), an eccentric, legendary comedian and game show host.

Cast and characters

Main
 John Mulaney as John Mulaney, a standup comedian and writer for Lou Cannon
 Nasim Pedrad as Googoosh "Jane" Parvana, a personal trainer
 Seaton Smith as Gerald "Motif" Goods, a standup comedian
 Zack Pearlman as Andre Van Horn, a drug dealer
 Elliott Gould as Oscar Glass, neighbor to John, Jane and Motif
 Martin Short as Louis "Lou" Cannon, a game show host and John's boss

Recurring
 Fortune Feimster as Mary Jo
 Julie Klausner as Donna

Guest stars
 Maria Thayer as Amanda the Doula
 Dan Mintz as Mintz
 Lorraine Bracco as Vaughn
 Penny Marshall as Tutti
 Nora Dunn as Patty Mulaney, John's mother
 Pete Holmes as Father Trey
 Nick Kroll as Jesse Tyler Munoz
 Bailee Madison as Ruby
 Dean Cain as himself

Production
The show was originally taped as a pilot for NBC, but was not picked up. Mulaney re-tooled the pilot, and then pitched it to Fox, who picked the show up with a cautious six-episode commitment. Fox later ordered an additional ten episodes. A trailer was released on May 12, 2014, along with an announcement that the show would air Sunday nights at 9:30 p.m., replacing the Seth MacFarlane sitcom, American Dad!, which moved to TBS. The series premiered October 5, 2014.

On October 18, 2014, the day before the third episode was supposed to air, Fox announced it was cutting three episodes from its order. This resulted in the production of Mulaney being shut down, as the thirteenth episode had already been filmed and production of the fourteenth was about to begin.  Less than a month later, Fox moved Mulaney into the 7:30 PM timeslot where Bob's Burgers had been airing. The season ended on February 15, 2015, and Fox announced Mulaneys cancellation shortly thereafter.

Episodes

Reception
Mulaney said:
Even before Mulaney aired, critics were wary of the direction of the show.  After viewing the show's trailer, Eric Dodds with TIME magazine penned an article called, "8 Ways the Trailer for Mulaney Resembles Seinfeld," and said it could "trigger a little déjà vu."  In regard to its multi-camera format, Canadian magazine Maclean's asked, "why would a cool comic pick such an uncool format?"

Ultimately, the show was universally panned by critics, with most reviews drawing unflattering comparisons to Seinfeld. On Rotten Tomatoes, the show has an approval rating of 17% based on 42 reviews, with an average rating of 4.27/10. The site's critical consensus states, "John Mulaney, we know Jerry Seinfeld. Seinfeld was funny. Mulaney, you're no Seinfeld." On Metacritic, the series has a weighted average score of 38 out of 100, based on 27 critics, indicating "generally unfavorable reviews".

James Poniewozik with TIME magazine said the show "seems like something a dutiful student might have produced for his final project in his 'Tropes and Themes in the 1990s Sitcom' class."  Robert Bianco with USA Today called the sitcom a "misfire." The show was named the fourth-worst show of 2014 by Entertainment Weekly.

Mulaney fared poorly commercially as well, with the series premiere only getting 2.3 million viewers, the  weakest scores for any of the fall's series premieres.  The episode from December 21, 2014, became the lowest rated episode, with fewer than 1 million views; the January 18, 2015, episode, airing after the NFC Championship Game, became the highest-rated, with over 3 million viewers.

References

External links

 
 

2014 American television series debuts
2015 American television series endings
2010s American LGBT-related comedy television series
2010s American sitcoms
Cultural depictions of American men
Cultural depictions of comedians
English-language television shows
Fox Broadcasting Company original programming
Television series about comedians
Television series about television
Television series by 3 Arts Entertainment
Television series by Broadway Video
Television series by Universal Television
Television shows set in New York City